Thomas F. Lüscher is a Swiss professor of cardiology, director of research, education and development and a consultant cardiologist at the Royal Brompton and Harefield NHS Foundation Trust and Imperial College London, and director of the Center for Molecular Cardiology at the University of Zurich.

He completed his PhD in 1988 at the University of Basel, with a thesis titled "Endothelial Vasoactive Substances and Cardiovascular Disease", in which he looked at the role of chemicals derived from endothelium on cardiovascular disease. From 1996 to 2017, he was professor and chairman of cardiology at the University Hospital of Zürich and director of CardioVascular Research at the Institute of Physiology, part of the University of Zurich.

Lüscher was the editor of the European Heart Journal from 2009 to 2020, by which time he had studied the endothelium for over 30 years. He has described COVID-19 as ultimately an endothelial disease. In 2021 he addressed one of the most popular heart health questions, "are wine, chocolate and coffee good or bad for you?".

Early life and education
Thomas Felix Lüscher is the son of doctor of medicine Emil Lüscher (1904–1977). He studied at the University of Zurich's medical school from 1972 to 1978, and completed his PhD in 1988 at the University of Basel, with a thesis titled "Endothelial Vasoactive Substances and Cardiovascular Disease", in which he looked at the role of chemicals derived from cells that line blood vessels on cardiovascular disease, such as high blood pressure, atherosclerosis, coronary artery disease, cerebral vasospasm and diabetic vascular disease. There he worked with Paul M. Vanhoutte and was inspired by the work of Robert F. Furchgott and John V. Zawadzki who in 1980 showed that the single-layered inner most lining (endothelium) of a large blood vessel controlled underlying vascular smooth muscle cells by releasing endothelium-derived relaxing factor, later found to be nitric oxide. With Vanhoutte, he authored the book The Endothelium – Modulator of Cardiovascular Function (1988).

Career
Lüscher trained in echocardiography and carried out cardiovascular research at the Mayo Clinic in Rochester before taking up a professorship in pharmacotherapy at University of Basel and then as interventional cardiologist and professor of cardiology at the University of Berne. From 1996 to 2017, he was professor and chairman of cardiology at the University Hospital of Zürich and director of CardioVascular Research at the Institute of Physiology, part of the University of Zurich. Working in the United States, Lüscher was associate editor of the American Heart Association's journal Circulation. In 2009 he was appointed editor of the European Heart Journal, a position he held until 2020. For the European Society of Cardiology, he co-founded the ESC journal ethics committee, to examine papers and investigate allegations of misconduct.

Since October 2017, he has been director of research, education and development and a consultant cardiologist at the Royal Brompton and Harefield NHS Foundation Trust and Imperial College London, and director of the Center for Molecular Cardiology at the University of Zurich.

By the COVID-19 pandemic of 2020, he had been studying the endothelium for over 30 years. He says that COVID-19 is ultimately an endothelial disease and stated that “the concept that the endothelium is the main target of this virus is really very important.”

Lüscher also researches the effects of chocolate and the flavanol epicatechin, partially funded by Nestlé and MARS. In an October 2021 article in  the European Heart Journal, he addressed one of the most popular heart health questions, "are wine, chocolate and coffee good or bad for you?". In summary, he concluded that with regard to cardiovascular (CV) health, wine is at best neutral, and only if in moderation; up to four cups of coffee a day might be protective; and chocolate "is a joy for our CV system, if consumed in dark, bitter form". He added that the optimal dose of chocolate is not yet known, but the most beneficial ingredient is the flavanols. The chocolate should contain little sugar and fat, and white chocolate is "not healthy at all."

Selected publications
The Institute for Scientific Information has rated Lüscher as one of the 0.5% most cited scientists worldwide.

Articles

Books

 (Co-author)
 (Co-author)
 (Co-author)

References

Living people
Swiss cardiologists
University of Zurich alumni
Academic staff of the University of Zurich
University of Basel alumni
Academics of Imperial College London
Year of birth missing (living people)